Tycen William Anderson (born June 13, 1999) is an American football safety for the Cincinnati Bengals of the National Football League (NFL). He played college football at Toledo.

Early life and high school
Anderson grew up in Toledo, Ohio and attended St. John's Jesuit High School and Academy, where he competed in basketball, football, and track. Anderson committed to play college football at Toledo over offers from Air Force, Kentucky, Bowling Green, and Eastern Kentucky.

College career
Anderson played in all 14 of Toledo's games as a freshman and recorded 30 tackles with four passes broken up. He was named  second-team All-Mid-American Conference (MAC) after playing in six games due to the MAC's COVID-19-shortened 2020 season. Anderson decided to utilize the extra year of eligibility granted to college athletes who played in the 2020 season due to the coronavirus pandemic and return to Toledo for a fifth season. He recorded 44 tackles with one sack and two passes broken up in his final season.

Professional career 

Anderson was drafted by the Cincinnati Bengals with the 166th overall pick in the fifth round of the 2022 NFL Draft. He was placed on injured reserve on September 2, 2022.

References

External links
 Cincinnati Bengals bio
Toledo Rockets bio

1999 births
Living people
Toledo Rockets football players
Players of American football from Ohio
Sportspeople from Toledo, Ohio
American football safeties
Cincinnati Bengals players